Gechugaa is a small village located at Kshetrapa, Dolakha, Nepal. In this village only four families live here.

Populated places in Dolakha District